Schizolaena capuronii is a tree in the family Sarcolaenaceae. It is endemic to Madagascar. The specific epithet is for the French botanist René Capuron.

Description
The inflorescences are small and have six to ten flowers, each with five petals. The fruits are unknown.

Distribution and habitat
Schizolaena capuronii is known only from a single population in the northern region of Analanjirofo.

References

capuronii
Endemic flora of Madagascar
Trees of Madagascar
Plants described in 1999